Pisaurina undulata is a species of nursery web spider in the family Pisauridae. It is found in the United States and Cuba.

References

Pisauridae
Articles created by Qbugbot
Spiders described in 1887